Ameba is an independent, subscription-based streaming video (IPTV) service that hosts educational TV shows, children's cartoons, and music videos via the web, mobile, tablet, smart TVs, gaming consoles, and connected smart devices. The privately funded company was founded in 2007 and is headquartered in Winnipeg, Manitoba, Canada. Ameba is currently available throughout the U.S. and Canada for free through AVOD (Ad supported VOD and Linear Streaming) and SVOD (subscription).  On March 21, 2019, Ameba became the first CAVCO accredited independent children's streaming service allowing content producers to meet the "shown in Canada" requirement for the Canadian Film or Video Production Tax Credit (CPTC) program.

Availability 

Ameba TV is available across multiple digital viewing platforms, including:

 the web
 Amazon Prime Video Channels
 Amazon Fire TV
 TiVo (standalone and Cable boxes)
 Xbox 360, 
 Roku media streamer,
 The Roku Channel, 
 Google TV, 
 LGE Smart TV, LGE 3D Blu-ray players, and LGE Smart TV Upgraders. 
 iOS devices, including iPad, iPod touch, and iPhone.
 Android Tablets and Phones.
 Chromecast
 Cinemood
 Xumo

Content Catalog
Ameba's content catalog comprises over 14,000 episodes and 2,800 hours of children's shows. The shows come from small independent providers, YouTube creators  and large producers from around the world. Titles are organized into multiple categories. They span several genres, including education, preschool, classics, movies, animation, music and much more. Ameba has a deep catalog of Nostalgic content from the 1980s, 1990s and 2000s.

References

External links
 
 Canadian press
 Indian press

Internet properties established in 2007
Mass media companies established in 2007
Canadian companies established in 2007
2007 establishments in Manitoba
Companies based in Winnipeg
Online companies of Canada
Subscription video on demand services
Xbox 360 software